World Orienteering Championships
World Orienteering Championships
International sports competitions hosted by Italy
Sport in Trentino
Sport in Veneto
July 2014 sports events in Europe
Orienteering in Italy